Asturina can refer to:
 Flag of Asturias (official flag of the Autonomous Community)
 Asturina cola estrella bermeya (Asturina with the red star), symbol of Asturian independence used by certain parties
 Genus Asturina, a synonym for Buteo including in particular the gray hawk and gray-lined hawk